Glyconeogenesis is the synthesis of glycogen without using glucose or other carbohydrates, instead using substances like proteins and fats. One example is the conversion of lactic acid to glycogen in the liver.

References 

Glucose